Alan Bowlby Mollohan (born May 14, 1943) is an American politician who served as the U.S. representative for  from 1983 to 2011. He was a member of the Democratic Party and the Blue Dog Coalition.

The district encompasses the northern part of the state; it is based in Wheeling and includes Parkersburg, Morgantown, Fairmont and Clarksburg. He served on the House Appropriations Committee and was ranking Democrat on the Ethics Committee until being asked to step down in 2006. He was defeated in the Democratic primary election held on May 11, 2010, by Mike Oliverio.

Early life and education
Born in Fairmont, West Virginia, Mollohan is the son of former U.S. Representative Robert Mollohan. He attended Greenbrier Military School and graduated from the College of William & Mary. Thereafter, Mollohan completed a Juris Doctor at West Virginia University College of Law.

Early career 
He served as "Of Counsel" for the Huntington, West Virginia branch of the law firm Nelson Mullins Riley & Scarborough. He served in the United States Army Reserve from 1970 to 1983, reaching the rank of captain.

U.S. House of Representatives

Committee assignments
Committee on Appropriations
Subcommittee on Commerce, Justice, Science, and Related Agencies (Chairman)
Subcommittee on Homeland Security
Subcommittee on Interior, Environment, and Related Agencies

Political campaigns
When Mollohan's father retired in 1982 after 16 years in Congress spread out over two stints, he endorsed his son as his successor. He was elected that November in a very competitive contest. He faced another close race in 1984, but was unopposed for a third term in 1986. He did not face serious opposition in a general election since, running unopposed in 1992, 1996, 2002 and 2008. In 1998 and 2000, no Republican candidate ran against Mollohan. In both of those years he was opposed by a Libertarian Richard Kerr, but Mollohan won.

He faced stiff electoral competition when, in 1992, West Virginia lost a House seat due to the 1990 Census. The redistricting placed Mollohan against another representative, 2nd District Congressman Harley O. Staggers, Jr. No other party put up a candidate, meaning that the Democratic primary was tantamount to election. It was predicted to be a tough primary, but Mollohan succeeded in winning his party's nomination with 60% of the vote.

2010

Mollohan faced a Democratic primary challenge on May 11, 2010, and lost to State senator Mike Oliverio, 56% to 44%. It was Mollohan's first contested primary since he faced Harley Staggers Jr. in 1992 after their Congressional districts were merged.

Since his first election in 1982 he only faced a total of six Republican challengers, the most recent being former state delegate Chris Wakim in 2006. In that race, Mollohan won 64% of the vote.

Controversies

On February 28, 2006, the National Legal and Policy Center filed a 500-page ethics complaint against Mollohan, alleging that the congressman misrepresented his assets on financial disclosure forms. Mollohan's real estate holdings and other assets have increased from $562,000 in 2000 to at least $6.3 million in 2004. For the period 1996 through 2004, NLPC alleged that his Financial Disclosure Reports failed to disclose real estate, corporate and financial assets that public records showed were owned by Mollohan and his wife.

On April 7, 2006, The New York Times reported that Mollohan "has fueled five non-profit groups in his West Virginia district with $250 million in earmark funding."  Mollohan created these nonprofit groups, which include the West Virginia High Technology Consortium Foundation, Institute for Scientific Research, Canaan Valley Institute, Vandalia Heritage Foundation, and MountainMade Foundation.  Leaders of these groups were sometimes investors with him, possibly leading to his own personal gain.

On April 21, 2006, House Minority Leader Nancy Pelosi announced that Mollohan would temporarily step down as the Ranking Democrat on the House Ethics Committee. Howard Berman of California took Mollohan's place.

On April 25, 2006, The Wall Street Journal reported that Mollohan and CEO Dale R. McBride of FMW Composite Systems Inc. of Bridgeport, West Virginia made a joint purchase of a  farm along West Virginia's Cheat River. Mollohan had directed a $2.1 million government contract earmarked to FWM Composite Systems to develop lightweight payload pallets for space-shuttle missions. Federal Bureau of Investigation agents have asked questions in Washington and West Virginia about Mollohan’s investments and whether they were properly disclosed, according to the Journal. Mollohan had previously acknowledged he may have made inadvertent mistakes on financial disclosure forms, and in June he filed corrections to his disclosure statements.

In January 2010, the U.S. Department of Justice stated that no charges would be filed against Mollohan and that it had closed its investigation. Ben Friedman of the U.S. Attorney's office in Washington told CREW that the Justice Department has "closed the investigation into the case."

Electoral history

References

External links

|-

1943 births
21st-century American politicians
Baptists from West Virginia
College of William & Mary alumni
Democratic Party members of the United States House of Representatives from West Virginia
Greenbrier Military School alumni
Living people
Military personnel from West Virginia
Lawyers from Fairmont, West Virginia
United States Army reservists
West Virginia lawyers
West Virginia University College of Law alumni
Politicians from Fairmont, West Virginia
Members of Congress who became lobbyists